Vladimir Ivanovich Vernadsky or Volodymyr Ivanovych Vernadsky ( – 6 January 1945) was a Russian, Ukrainian and Soviet mineralogist and geochemist who is considered one of the founders of geochemistry, biogeochemistry, and radiogeology. He was one of the founders and the first president of the Ukrainian Academy of Sciences (now National Academy of Sciences of Ukraine). Vladimir Vernadsky is most noted for his 1926 book The Biosphere in which he inadvertently worked to popularize Eduard Suess' 1885 term biosphere, by hypothesizing that life is the geological force that shapes the earth. In 1943 he was awarded the Stalin Prize.  Vernadsky's portrait is depicted on the Ukrainian ₴1,000 hryvnia banknote.

Early life

According to family legend, his father's ancestors were Zaporozhian Cossacks. Ivan Vernadsky had been a professor of political economy in Kyiv at the St. Vladimir University before moving to Saint Petersburg; then he was an Active State Councillor and worked in the Governing Senate in St. Petersburg. Vladimir's mother was a Russian noblewoman of Ukrainian Cossack descent. In 1868 his family relocated to Kharkiv, and in 1873 he entered the Kharkiv provincial gymnasium.
Vernadsky graduated from Saint Petersburg State University in 1885. As the position of mineralogist in Saint Petersburg State University was vacant, and Vasily Dokuchaev, a soil scientist, and Alexey Pavlov, a geologist, had been teaching Mineralogy for a while, Vernadsky chose to enter Mineralogy. He wrote to his wife Nataliia on 20 June 1888 from Switzerland:
 In 1888–1890, he traveled through Europe, studying the museums of Paris and London, and worked in Munich and Paris.

While trying to find a topic for his doctorate, he first went to Naples to study under crystallographer Arcangelo Scacchi, who was senile by that time. Scacchi's condition led Vernadsky to go to Germany to study under Paul Groth, curator of minerals in the Deutsches Museum in Munich. Vernadsky learned to use Groth's modern equipment, which included a machine to study the optical, thermal, elastic, magnetic and electrical properties of crystals. He also gained access to the physics lab of Leonhard Sohncke (Direktor, 1883–1886; Professor der Physik an der Technischen Hochschule München 1886–1897), who was studying crystallisation during that period.

In his childhood, his father had a huge influence on his development, he very carefully and consistently engaged in the upbringing and education of his son. It was he who instilled in Volodymyr interest and love for the Ukrainian people, their history and culture. The future scientist recalled that before moving from Kharkiv to St. Petersburg, he and his father were abroad and in Milan, they read about a circular in Pyotr Lavrov's newspaper "Forward" that forbade printing in Ukrainian in Russia. In his memoirs, he wrote:

 

In St. Petersburg, a 15-year-old boy noted in his diary on March 29, 1878:

Political activities
Vernadsky participated in the First General Congress of the zemstvos, held in Petersburg on the eve of the 1905 Russian Revolution to discuss how best to pressure the government to the needs of the Russian society; became a member of the liberal Constitutional Democratic Party (KD); and served in parliament, resigning to protest the Tsar's proroguing of the Duma. He served as professor and later as vice rector of Moscow University, from which he also resigned in 1911 in protest over the government's reactionary policies.

Following the advent of the First World War, his proposal for the establishment of the Commission for the Study of the Natural Productive Forces (KEPS) was adopted by the Imperial Academy of Sciences in February 1915. He published War and the Progress of Science where he stressed the importance of science as regards to its contribution to the war effort:

After the war of 1914–1915 we will have to make known and accountable the natural productive forces of our country, i.e. first of all to find means for broad scientific investigations of Russia’s nature and for the establishment of a network of well equipped research laboratories, museums and institutions ... This is no less necessary than the need for an improvement in the conditions of our civil and political life, which is so acutely perceived by the entire country.

After the February Revolution of 1917, he served on several commissions of agriculture and education of the provisional government, including as assistant minister of education.

Vladimir Vernadsky belonged to the small group of ethnic Ukrainians who had dual "Russian – Ukrainian" identity  and considered the Ukrainian culture as part of Russia imperial culture and even declined to become a Ukrainian citizen in 1918.

Scientific activities
Vernadsky first popularized the concept of the noosphere and deepened the idea of the biosphere to the meaning largely recognized by today's scientific community. The word 'biosphere' was invented by Austrian geologist Eduard Suess, whom Vernadsky met in 1911.

In Vernadsky's theory of the Earth's development, the noosphere is the third stage in the earth's development, after the geosphere (inanimate matter) and the biosphere (biological life). Just as the emergence of life fundamentally transformed the geosphere, the emergence of human cognition will fundamentally transform the biosphere. In this theory, the principles of both life and cognition are essential features of the Earth's evolution, and must have been implicit in the earth all along. This systemic and geological analysis of living systems complements Charles Darwin's theory of natural selection, which looks at each individual species, rather than at its relationship to a subsuming principle.

Vernadsky's visionary pronouncements were not widely accepted in the West. However, he was one of the first scientists to recognize that the oxygen, nitrogen and carbon dioxide in the Earth's atmosphere result from biological processes. During the 1920s he published works arguing that living organisms could reshape the planets as surely as any physical force. Vernadsky was an important pioneer of the scientific bases for the environmental sciences.

Vernadsky was a member of the Russian and Soviet Academies of Sciences since 1912 and was a founder and first president of the Ukrainian Academy of Sciences in Kyiv, Ukraine (1918). He was a founder of the National Library of Ukrainian State and worked closely with the Tavrida University in Crimea. During the Russian Civil War, he hosted gatherings of the young intellectuals who later founded the émigré Eurasianism movement.

In the late 1930s and early 1940s Vernadsky played an early advisory role in the Soviet atomic bomb project, as one of the most forceful voices arguing for the exploitation of nuclear power, the surveying of Soviet uranium sources, and having nuclear fission research conducted at his Radium Institute. He died, however, before a full project was pursued.

On religious views, Vernadsky was an atheist. He was interested in Hinduism and Rig Veda.

Vernadsky's son George Vernadsky (1887–1973) emigrated to the United States where he published numerous books on medieval and modern Russian history.

The National Library of Ukraine, the Tavrida National University in Crimea and many streets and avenues in Ukraine and Russia are named in honor of Vladimir Vernadsky.

UNESCO sponsored an international scientific conference, "Globalistics-2013", at Moscow State University on 23–25 October 2013, in honor of Vernadsky's 150th birthday.

Family
 Father – Ivan Vernadsky, Russian Imperial economist
 Mother – Аnna Konstantinovich, Russian music instructor
 Wife – Nataliia Yegorovna Staritskaya (married in 1887 in Saint Petersburg)
 Son – George Vernadsky, American Russian historian, an author of numerous books on Russian history and philosophy
 Daughter – Nina Toll, Doctor-psychiatrist

Legacy

 Vernadsky National Library of Ukraine is the main academic library in Ukraine
 Ukrainian Antarctic station Akademik Vernadsky
 Tavrida National V.I. Vernadsky University, university in Simferopol
 Vernadsky Institute of geochemistry and analytical chemistry, a research institution of the Russian Academy of Sciences
 Vernadsky State Geological Museum is the oldest museum in Moscow
 Vernadsky Mountain Range is a mountains in Antarctica and is an extension of the Gamburtsev Mountain Range.
 Bulvar Akademika Vernadskoho (Academician Vernadsky Boulevard) is a street in Kyiv
 Vulytsia Petra Zaporozhtsia (in 1961–1963 vulytsia Akademika Vernadsky) is a street in Kyiv
 Vernadskiy (crater), a lunar crater
 Vernadsky Medal awarded annually by the International Association of GeoChemistry
 2809 Vernadskij, an asteroid

On 25 October 2019 the National Bank of Ukraine put in circulation a ₴1,000 hryvnia banknote with Vernadsky's portrait.

Selected works

Geochemistry, published in Russian 1924
The Biosphere, first published in Russian in 1926. English translations:
Oracle, AZ, Synergetic Press, 1986, 86 pp.
tr. David B. Langmuir, ed. Mark A. S. McMenamin, New York, Copernicus, 1997, 192 pp.
Essays on Geochemistry & the Biosphere, tr. Olga Barash, Santa Fe, NM, Synergetic Press, 2006

Diaries
Dnevniki 1917–1921: oktyabr 1917-yanvar 1920 (Diaries 1917–1921), Kyiv, Naukova dumka, 1994, 269 pp.
Dnevniki. Mart 1921-avgust 1925 (Diaries 1921–1925), Moscow, Nauka, 1998, 213 pp.
Dnevniki 1926–1934 (Diaries 1926–1934), Moscow, Nauka, 2001, 455 pp.
Dnevniki 1935–1941 v dvukh knigakh. Kniga 1, 1935–1938 (Diaries 1935–1941 in two volumes. Volume 1, 1935–1938), Moscow, Nauka, 2006,,444 pp.
Dnevniki 1935–1941 v dvukh knigakh. Kniga 2, 1939–1941 (Diaries 1935–1941. Volume 2, 1939–1941), Moscow, Nauka, 2006, 295 pp.

See also
Gaia theory (science)
Noosphere
Pierre Teilhard de Chardin
Prospekt Vernadskogo District
Russian philosophy

References

Bibliography
 
"Science and Russian Cultures in an Age of Revolutions"

External links

 The grave of Vernadsky
 Behrends, Thilo, The Renaissance of V.I. Vernadsky, Newsletter of the Geochemical Society, #125, October 2005, http://www.geochemsoc.org/files/4813/4436/8118/gn125.pdf retrieved 27 April 2013
 Vernadsky's biography
 Electronic archive of writings from and about Vernadsky (Russian) http://vernadsky.lib.ru/

 
 

1863 births
1945 deaths
Scientists from Saint Petersburg
People from Sankt-Peterburgsky Uyezd
Russian people of Ukrainian descent
Presidents of the National Academy of Sciences of Ukraine
Russian Constitutional Democratic Party members
Members of the State Council (Russian Empire)
Cosmists
Soviet geochemists
Ukrainian geochemists
Russian geochemists
Russian philosophers
Full members of the Saint Petersburg Academy of Sciences
Full Members of the Russian Academy of Sciences (1917–1925)
Full Members of the USSR Academy of Sciences
Ukrainian philosophers
Russian atheists
Russian biologists
Russian mineralogists
Stalin Prize winners
Recipients of the Order of the Red Banner of Labour
Recipients of the Order of Saint Stanislaus (Russian), 2nd class
Recipients of the Order of St. Anna, 2nd class
Russian expatriates in Ukraine
Emigrants from the Russian Empire to Switzerland
Privy Councillor (Russian Empire)
Burials at Novodevichy Cemetery
Russian untitled nobility